Jill Novick (born in Westchester County, New York) is an American actress. She played Tracy Gaylian, the girlfriend of Brandon in the 1996–1997 season of Beverly Hills, 90210.  Jill Novick played the young Theodora "Teddy" Reed on the TV series Sisters

Jill graduated from Mamaroneck High School in Mamaroneck, New York with the class of 1984. One of her classmates and friends was fellow actor Kevin Dillon.

She appeared on the TV show Falcone. Novick returned to school and has had a teaching career in recent years. Jill Novick is a stagecraft teacher and the creative director of theatre at Cibola High School in New Mexico.

References

External links
 

Living people
People from Mamaroneck, New York
Actresses from New York (state)
American film actresses
American television actresses
Mamaroneck High School alumni
Schoolteachers from California
American women educators
21st-century American women
Year of birth missing (living people)